Muhammad Aslam Abro is a Pakistani politician who has been a member of the Provincial Assembly of Sindh since August 2018.

Political career

He was elected to the Provincial Assembly of Sindh as a candidate of Pakistan Tehreek-e-Insaf from  PS-1 (Jacobabad-I) in the 2018 Sindh provincial election.

References

Living people
Pakistan Tehreek-e-Insaf MPAs (Sindh)
Year of birth missing (living people)